Sternoclavicular ligament can refer to:
 Anterior sternoclavicular ligament (ligamentum sternoclaviculare anterius)
 Posterior sternoclavicular ligament (ligamentum sternoclaviculare posterius)